Cinthia Bouhier (born 24 January 1979, in Angers) is a French former synchronized swimmer who competed in the 2000 Summer Olympics.

She was a performer with the Cirque du soleil production "O" at the Bellagio Hotel & Casino Las Vegas, NV from 2004 to 2011.

References

1979 births
Living people
French synchronized swimmers
Olympic synchronized swimmers of France
Synchronized swimmers at the 2000 Summer Olympics